"Encore un soir" (meaning "One More Night") is a song recorded by Canadian singer Celine Dion, released as the lead single from her French-language album of the same name, issued on 26 August 2016. It was written by Jean-Jacques Goldman, and produced by Goldman, Yann Macé and Luc Leroy. The song is dedicated to Dion's late husband René Angélil, who died in January 2016. "Encore un soir" garnered positive reviews from music critics and was commercially successful topping the charts in France, Quebec and the French-speaking part of Switzerland, Romandy. It also reached the top ten in Luxembourg and Belgium and was certified diamond in France and gold in Switzerland.

Background and release
On 22 October 2015, Dion's official website announced that the singer was "working hard" on her new French album. The track title, "Encore un soir", was originally unveiled on 15 January 2016 by various news outlets. On 17 May 2016, it was confirmed in an interview with Paris Match that the single would be available for digital download on 24 May 2016. The song also became available on streaming services, including YouTube and Vevo.

Critical reception
"Encore un soir" received critical acclaim from music critics. Nicolas Houle from La Presse wrote that "Encore un soir", written by Jean-Jacques Goldman, comes with remarkable restraint and subtlety and is without a doubt the strongest track on the album. Alain de Repentigny, from La Presse+ stated that the title track, an ode to life, makes an impact on the album and during the live performances as well. "Encore un soir" was also praised by Le Figaro, Femme Actuelle, Ciné Télé Revue, Public.fr, HollywoodLife.com and Idolator, as a touching tribute to Dion's late husband, René Angélil.

Commercial performance
In France, "Encore un soir" debuted at number one, after only three days of sales, selling 7,809 copies. It dethroned Justin Timberlake's "Can't Stop the Feeling!" and achieved the highest weekly single sales of 2016. "Encore un soir" became Dion's sixth number one in France. Also with the success of the single, Dion was marked the artist with the most weeks at number one atop the French Singles chart (thirty-eight weeks). "Encore un soir" stayed at the top of the French chart for a second week, selling 5,166 digital copies. The last time Dion spent at least two weeks at number one was fifteen years ago with "Sous le vent". In the next weeks, "Encore un soir" has charted within the top ten since its debut in May. After maintaining the top spot for two weeks, the following week "Encore un soir" dropped to number four selling 3,081 copies. The next week it dropped to number seven selling 2,377 units. Later, the song rose to number four again selling 3,141 copies. After the shows in Paris during Dion's Summer Tour 2016, the song went up to number two in France, selling over 3,200 units. The following week, the single dropped one position to number three selling 2,998 copies.

In the eighth week, the song stayed at number three selling 3,601 units in France. Later, it went up to number two selling 2,370 copies. In the next three weeks, "Encore un soir" occupied positions: nine (2,133 units sold), eight (2,100) and seven (2,000). After twelve weeks, the song has sold over 40,000 copies in France. In the thirteenth week, it fell to number ten, staying inside top ten for thirteen consecutive weeks, and selling another 1,513 units. In the fourteenth week, the song went up to number three selling over 1,700 copies. In the fifteenth week, it returned to number one selling 4,421 units. The same week, the album Encore un soir entered the chart at the top in France. The next week, both song and the album stayed at number one. The single has sold 3,969 copies and achieved fourth week at the top in France, beating "Sous le vent"'s three weeks at number one. In the seventeenth week, "Encore un soir" fell to number two selling 2,786 units and bringing the total sales to 54,472 copies. On 29 July 2016, the single was certified gold by the SNEP in France. In the eighteenth week, "Encore un soir" dropped to number seven selling 1,918 copies. The next week, the single rose to number six with sales of 1,464 copies. In the twentieth week, "Encore un soir" jumped to number four selling 1,946 copies. In the twenty-first week, it fell one place selling 1,871 units (61,674 in total). After twenty-one weeks inside top ten in France, the single fell in its twenty-second week to number twelve and sold another 1,300 copies. Among Dion singles, only "Pour que tu m'aimes encore" spent more time inside top ten in France - thirty-one weeks. On 21 October 2016, the single was certified platinum in France for twenty million cumulative sales (downloads and streaming). On 29 December 2017, the single was certified diamond in France.

After only three days of sales, the song debuted at number ten in Belgium Wallonia (number seven on the Belgian Digital Songs), number twenty-five in Switzerland (number one on the Romandy chart and number six on the Swiss Digital Songs), number four in Luxembourg, and number thirty-one in Hungary. On the Euro Digital Songs, "Encore un soir" debuted at number eighteen. In Canada, also after just three days of sales, "Encore un soir" entered the Hot Digital Songs chart at number fifteen. Additionally, it debuted at number thirty-nine on the Canadian Adult Contemporary chart and despite being an essential English chart, it charted at number ninety-two on the Canadian Hot 100. Dion also debuted on the Quebec Digital Singles Chart at number one. Since its debut, "Encore un soir" has remained at number one in Quebec for sixteen consecutive weeks. It also topped for three weeks the Quebec Adult Pop Songs chart.

Music video
On 8 July 2016, Dion filmed the music video on Kleber Street in Paris. It was scheduled to be released in August 2016. The video was directed by Greg & Lio (French duo Lionel Hirlé and Grégory Ohrel), and featured French actor, François Pouron. Since late August 2016, fragments of the video could only be seen during the commercials promoting the album on television, but the full music video was never released.

Live performances
Dion performed "Encore un soir" during her Summer Tour 2016. She performed it for the very first time on television on M6's Music Show – 100% tubes 2016 in France on 7 September 2016. On 1 October 2016, Dion sang it during Le Grand Show on France 2. She also performed "Encore un soir" in France during her 2017 tour, and select dates of her Courage World Tour.

Track listing
Digital single
"Encore un soir" (Radio Edit) – 3:52

Digital single
"Encore un soir" (Album Version) – 4:23

Credits and personnel
Recording
Recorded at Hyperion Studio (Marseille), Addictive Studio (Paris) and Studio at the Palms (Las Vegas)

Personnel

Jean-Jacques Goldman – songwriting, production, arrangement, background vocals
Yann Macé – production, arrangement, mixing, drums, percussion, keyboards, programming
Luc Leroy – production, arrangement, piano, keyboards, programming
Humberto Gatica – vocal recording
Martin Nessi – vocal recording
Rob Katz – vocal recording assistant
Mark Gray – vocal recording assistant
Jason Patterson – vocal recording assistant
Thomas Ivaldy – recording
Vincent Martinez – guitars
Magali Ponsada – background vocals
Jacques Veneruso – background vocals

Charts

Weekly charts

Year-end charts

Certifications and sales

Release history

See also
List of number-one hits of 2016 (France)
List of number-one hits of 2016 (Switzerland)

References

External links

2016 singles
2016 songs
Celine Dion songs
French-language songs
SNEP Top Singles number-one singles
Commemoration songs
Songs written by Jean-Jacques Goldman